Martin Place is a pedestrian mall in the Sydney central business district, New South Wales, Australia. Martin Place has been described as the "civic heart" of Sydney. As home to the Reserve Bank of Australia, the Commonwealth Bank, Macquarie Bank, Westpac and other corporations, it is also a centre of business and finance. The Sydney GPO and the Seven Network's Sydney news centre are also located on Martin Place.

Martin Place has become a national Australian icon in popular culture for attracting high-end film and television productions and actors to the area. Martin Place runs between George Street and Macquarie Street, and provides entrances to the Martin Place railway station below street level. Other cross streets include Pitt Street, Castlereagh Street, Elizabeth Street and Phillip Street.

The initial "Martin Place" was the section between George Street and Pitt Street, officially opened 1892, and was named in honour of Sir James Martin, the three time Premier of New South Wales and Chief Justice of Supreme Court of New South Wales. Closed to traffic in stages from 1971, Martin Place is surrounded by many heritage buildings and features the 1927 World War I Sydney Cenotaph, water fountain, entertainment area, railway access and pedestrian seating.

History

Today's Martin Place was built in several phases. Until the late 19th century, only the section between Pitt Street and Castlereagh Street existed in anything resembling the present form, as a short street named Moore Street. Between Pitt Street and George Street there was only a small laneway (similar to nearby surviving laneways such as Angel Place or Hosking Place). In 1863, construction began on the present General Post Office Building on the south side of the laneway. The building was constructed in stages, and when the design changed to provide for a main façade on the longer north side (instead of facing George Street to the west), there were concomitant proposals to widen the existing laneway into a street connected to Moore Street. A fire which destroyed properties to the north of the laneway provided the impetus for the construction, and in 1892 (a year after the Venetian-Italianate-style General Post Office was completed) the widened street was officially opened and named "Martin Place", in honour of New South Wales premier and Chief Justice James Martin. The General Post Office occupied the entire southern frontage of the street.

Both Moore Street and Martin Place became prominent centres of business and finance in Sydney. In 1913, the headquarters of the Commonwealth Bank was constructed on the corner of Moore Street and Pitt Street. In later years, other banks followed with a range of impressive buildings (see "Architecture" below). In 1921, Moore Street was renamed as part of Martin Place.

Conscription rallies for World War I took place here. In 1927, a Cenotaph commemorating the WWI dead was erected. Soon after, the Sydney Municipal Council proposed to extend the street further east towards Macquarie Street. However, the plan was delayed by concerted opposition from landowners of the buildings that would have to be demolished to make way for the extension. One of the buildings demolished to make way for the extended Martin Place was St Stephen's Presbyterian Church, on the east side of Phillip Street, which was replaced by the present church on Macquarie Street in 1935. The extension was finally completed in 1935, resulting in the Martin Place stretching from George Street to Macquarie Street seen today.

The increasingly important role of Martin Place as the "heart" or "town square" of Sydney (see "Events" below) led to calls for the street to be pedestrianised. This was done progressively from 1971 until 1979, when the whole street became a pedestrian mall. The closure of the street to traffic was partly timed to coincide with the construction of Martin Place railway station under the eastern section of the street. Martin Place was closed between Macquarie and Phillip Streets from January 1972 to facilitate the station's construction. The station opened in 1979. Leo Port, the Lord Mayor of Sydney was an advocate of civic design, and was partly responsible for the pedestrianisation of Martin Place and Sydney Square.

A number of the street's older buildings were demolished in this period to make way for modernist buildings. The most prominent of these is 25 Martin Place, designed by Harry Seidler.

Architecture

Martin Place has a large collection of buildings of various styles, from neo-classical to contemporary.

Notable buildings

Demolished buildings 
Several buildings located at Martin Place have been demolished:

 Rural Bank Building (1936–1983)
 Hotel Australia
 St. Stephen's Presbyterian Church.

Adjacent buildings

 At the Macquarie Street end, the Sydney Hospital.
 At the George Street end, the heritage-listed Westpac building, and the heritage-listed The Commercial Banking Company of Sydney Limited building, which currently houses a Burberry store.
 On Elizabeth Street, the Sun Building was formerly the headquarters of The Sun, an afternoon paper that ceased publication in the 1980s. This skyscraper Gothic building is one of only three buildings in Sydney in this style.
 On George Street, Société Générale House is American Romanesque in style, and originally housed the Equitable Life Assurance Society of America.

Other features

Other features of Martin Place include:
 Sydney Cenotaph, located between the GPO Building and Challis House, commemorates Anzac forces who served in World War I, as well as Australians who gave their lives in subsequent conflicts. This was originally built from Moruya granite by stonemasons working on the Sydney Harbour Bridge, and dedicated on 8 August 1927.
 A water fountain is located on the east side of Pitt Street, near the Commonwealth Bank building. Behind this fountain is an amphitheatre, which features a stage that can be mechanically raised when required for performances.
 Entrances to the underground railway station and attached plaza.
 A Commando Memorial is located in the centre of Martin Place near the eastern end. It commemorates Australian commandos who were killed during World War II.

Heritage listings 
There are a number of heritage-listed buildings in Martin Place, including:

 1 Martin Place: General Post Office, Sydney
 4–10 Martin Place: Challis House
 38–46 Martin Place: MLC Building
 53–63 Martin Place: Australian Provincial Assurance Building
 65 Martin Place: Reserve Bank of Australia Building

Transport

George Street, Elizabeth Street, and Castlereagh Street, which cross Martin Place, are all major bus routes in Sydney's CBD. In addition, Martin Place railway station is located underground. Also nearby are St James railway station (near Macquarie Street end) and Wynyard railway station (near George Street end).

The new Sydney Metro line will include a station located underneath the existing station and is due to open in 2024.

Events

From its origins as a narrow laneway, Martin Place has over time become the "civic heart" of Sydney. Apart from its central location, the presence of the General Post Office and its attached telegraph office meant that this was the location where important news first arrived in the city. As a result, in earlier decades this was a focal point for gatherings to await or celebrate significant events. The cenotaph was sited on Martin Place outside the General Post Office because this was where crowds gathered in the city at the end of World War I. Martin Place is now the centre of the city's official war commemoration ceremonies. The extensions of the street gave it new significance in the civic scheme of the city, forming a broad and open connection between George Street, the original "High Street" and commercial axis, and Macquarie Street, the ceremonial avenue and governmental axis. People still gather on the plaza today to participate in significant events, for example to watch live broadcasts on a large television screen during the 2000 Summer Olympics, or the apology to the Stolen Generation in 2008. An amphitheatre built into the plaza near Pitt Street has hosted music and cultural events, as well as political protests.

Some regular civic events now held on Martin Place include:
 Martin Place was a major opening night site during the annual Sydney Festival in early January.
 An Anzac Day dawn service has been held on 25 April at the Cenotaph every year since 1927.
 Visual art displays during Vivid Sydney in late May to early June each year,
 Outdoor concerts are held in the amphitheatre throughout the year.
 Sydney's largest Christmas tree stands in Martin Place every year in front of the GPO in November and December. A Christmas concert is held in late November, when the tree is first lit by the Lord Mayor.

Some events that have occurred in Martin Place include:
 In 1901, a large temporary colonnade and Federation Arch was constructed between George Street and Pitt Street to celebrate the Federation of Australia and the visit of the first Governor General, Lord Hopetoun.
 In 1954, a motorcade, with Queen Elizabeth and the Duke of Edinburgh, drove along Martin Place during their first visit to Australia.
 The official opening of Stage I of the pedestrianisation of Martin Place between George Street and Pitt Street took place at 1.00pm on Friday 10 September 1971, by Lord Mayor L. Emmet McDermott.
 The official opening of Stage II took place in July 1976 and Stage V in September 1977.
 The official opening of Stages III and IV of Martin Place took place at 1.00pm on Monday 7 May 1979, by Lord Mayor Nelson Meers, coinciding with the opening of the Eastern Suburbs Railway.
 Martin Place was a live outdoor venue for the Sydney 2000 Summer Olympics featuring 4.8 by 6.4 metre television screens broadcasting live coverage.
 The Occupy Sydney protest movement occupied a section of Martin Place close to the Macquarie Street end from 15 October 2011. Some protesters were removed on 23 October 2011. A series of evictions by authorities and re-establishment by protestors occurred in July 2013, ending with the final eviction of the camp on 9 July 2013.
 2012 Sydney anti-Islam film protests – On 15 September 2012, around 300 Muslims protested in response to the anti-Islam film Innocence of Muslims in Sydney CBD, including Martin Place. The event escalated into scenes of violent confrontation between police and various protesters, particularly around the areas of Martin Place and Hyde Park.
 2014 Sydney hostage crisis – On 15–16 December 2014, Martin Place was placed into lock-down after an incident involving an Islamic gunman at the Lindt Café, with 18 people taken hostage. The armed siege had killed three people—two victims and the perpetrator himself. After the crisis it was reported that bogus Buddhist monks appeared targeting mourners over donations.
 A group of homeless people known as Tent City camping in the upper section of the mall from December 2016, leaving in August 2017.

Appearances in popular culture

Film
 The Matrix trilogy: The Lloyd Rees fountain near the intersection of Martin Place and Pitt Street was featured in the film The Matrix (1999), where Neo is distracted by the Woman in the Red Dress. The fountain has been rebuilt since the film was made. Martin Place was also the location of the final fight between Neo and Agent Smith in The Matrix Revolutions.
 Superman Returns (2006), in the scenes where Superman saves Kitty Kowalski from a car accident.

Television
 The studios of Seven's flagship programs Seven News, Sunrise and Weekend Sunrise. Non-flagship programmes filmed in that studio include Seven Early News, Seven Morning News and Seven News at 4 along with entertainment show The Morning Show are all broadcast from the Seven Network's Martin Place studios.
 Rake, an ABC television series based on a self-destructive barrister is based in Martin Place.
 Martin Place and the bar Hotel Chambers (located on the Elizabeth Street corner) were prominently featured in the Australian telemovie Go Big.
 The Mole's 2005 series of reality television series featured a live elimination round filmed in the Seven Network studios in Martin Place. The final round in which the Mole and the winner were revealed was also filmed here; one notable past contestant outside the studio that night was Bob Young, winner of the Weakest Link special in season 3.
 The Amazing Race: Martin Place was featured during a Roadblock task in second season of the reality television series The Amazing Race.

See also

Sydney central business district
George Street, Sydney
Macquarie Street, Sydney

References

External links

 GPO Sydney
 Martin Place architecture
 Martin Place Cenotaph at the Register of War Memorials in New South Wales website.
  [CC-By-SA]

 
Streets in Sydney
Pedestrian malls in Sydney
Squares in Sydney